WICN (90.5 FM) is a National Public Radio member station in Worcester, Massachusetts. It broadcasts commercial-free, 24 hours a day to an audience of over 40,000.  The programming is mostly jazz, with daily evening shows dedicated to soul, bluegrass, Americana, folk and blues, world music, and Sunday night public affairs programming. WICN's mission statement is as follows:
 "Arts and culture contribute to a quality of life that keeps a community vibrant and economically alive. WICN Public Radio is committed to this ideal through the presentation of authentic, independent music, on the radio and in the concert halls, preserving America's living art forms of Jazz and Folk music for generations to enjoy."

History
WICN began in 1969 as Worcester's Inter-Collegiate Network, joining with The College of the Holy Cross and Worcester Polytechnic Institute. In 1980, the station became a member of National Public Radio, & was accredited by the Corporation for Public Broadcasting in 1987.  Through 2000, their studios were located at 6 Chatham Street. This location was formerly a YWCA and the swimming pool, now drained, housed the station's record collection. At this time the station's transmitter was 8,000 watts (directional) and co-located at the WUNI TV tower on Styles hill in Boylston. In March 2010, WICN completed another change making its signal less directional. It is now located on Asnebumskit Hills in Paxton, Massachusetts along with the antenna for WAAF (now WKVB).

See also
 List of jazz radio stations in the United States

References

External links
 
 

WICN
Radio stations established in 1969
Jazz radio stations in the United States
ICN
1969 establishments in Massachusetts